Gramastetten is a municipality in the Austrian state of Upper Austria in the district of Urfahr-Umgebung in the upper Mühlviertel.

Population

Tourism

Health resort Gramastetten 
Near the state capital Linz you can find relaxation and impressive nature. The idyllic Rodlbad is a very popular nature styled bath. It is situated in a forest clearing with a playground, paddling pool and a pleasant buffet. The buffet offers frequently a barbecue with an impressive atmosphere.

See also
Linz sisters

References

Cities and towns in Urfahr-Umgebung District